The Tarata Department was a territorial division of Chile that existed between 1911 and 1921. Its territory comprised some controversial territory east of Sama River.

History
In 1885, after the Chilean victory in the War of the Pacific, Chile integrated Tarata into the Tacna Department of the newly formed Tacna Province. The Department was officially created under president Ramón Barros' administration on December 2, 1911, under law № 2,575, published in the Chilean Diario Oficial newspaper. The Department's territory was composed of the 8th and 9th subdelegaciones of Tacna Department. The comune of Tarata was chosen as its capital, and some parts of its administration, such as its judicial administration, were shared with nearby Arica Department.

The creation of the Department caused controversy in Peru, due to both countries disagreeing on their border in the Sama river. While the Chilean government argued the town was to the east of the river, the border agreed upon by both countries, Peru disputed this claim on the grounds that the territory was not affected by the Treaty of Ancón and sent representative Carlos Maria Elías to protest the situation, also establishing a policy of non-recognition. Around this time, raids by Peruvian smugglers as well as soldiers took place in the region, and there were also claims of military escalation, including claims of Peruvian troops mobilizing near the Chilean border, which were denied by the Peruvian government. U.S. President Calvin Coolidge mediated the dispute in Peru's favor in 1925, more so than other heads of state. Around the same time, a commission, headed by U.S. General John J. Pershing arrived to assist with the planned Tacna-Arica plebiscite, which eventually would never take place.

The Department was abolished under Arturo Alessandri's administration by law № 3,802 on September 22, 1921. On September 1st, 1925, at exactly 10 a.m., Chile handed over the former Department to Peru in a ceremony that took place in the main square, with representatives from both countries present: with  representing Chile, Manuel de Freyre y Santander representing Peru, and General Pershing representing the United States.

Administration
The Municipality of Tacna oversaw the administration of the department of Tacna, including Tarata, with its headquarters located in Tacna, where the Departmental Government, and the Provincial Intendancy were located.

With the Decree of Creation of Municipalities of December 22, 1891, the following municipalities were created with their headquarters and whose territories are the sub-delegations detailed below:

See also
Treaty of Ancón
Tacna Province (Chile)

References

1884 establishments in Chile
States and territories disestablished in 1925
States and territories established in 1884
1925 disestablishments in Chile
Former departments of Chile